North Carolina's 62nd House district is one of 120 districts in the North Carolina House of Representatives. It has been represented by Republican John Faircloth since 2019.

Geography
Since 2003, the district has included part of Guilford County. The district overlaps with the 26th, 27th, and 28th Senate districts.

District officeholders

Election results

2022

2020

2018

2016

2014

2012

2010

2008

2006

2004

2002

2000

References

North Carolina House districts
Guilford County, North Carolina